Persatuan Sepakbola Indonesia Klaten (simply known as PSIK Klaten) is an Indonesian football club based in Klaten Regency, Central Java. They currently compete in the Liga 3.

Players

Current squad

Honours
 Liga 3 Central Java
 Runners-up: 2022

References

External links

Football clubs in Indonesia
Football clubs in Central Java
Association football clubs established in 1946
1946 establishments in Indonesia